Rainbow Lake or Rainbow Lakes may refer to:

Geography

Canada
Rainbow Lake, Alberta

United States

 Rainbow Lake (Arizona)
 Rainbow Lake (White Cloud Mountains) in Custer County, Idaho
 Rainbow Lake (Maine)
 Rainbow Lake (Waterford Township, Michigan)
 Rainbow Lakes, New Jersey, a census-designated place
 Rainbow Lake (New Jersey), the cluster of water bodies within the CDP
 Rainbow Lake Wilderness, Bayfield County, Wisconsin
 Rainbow Lakes Estates, Florida
 Rainbow Lake in the Alpine Lakes Wilderness, part of the Island Lakes, Washington